Ivan Tahirovič is a retired Slovenian football player.

External links
 Stats at PrvaLiga.

Slovenian footballers
NK Ljubljana players
NK Svoboda Ljubljana players
Living people
1965 births
Association football goalkeepers